Game On is a British television sitcom, created by Bernadette Davis and Andrew Davies, and produced by Hat Trick Productions for BBC Two. The series stars Ben Chaplin, Matthew Cottle and Samantha Janus as three flatmates living in London. Chaplin departed the series following the first series and was replaced by Neil Stuke for the remainder of the show's run.

Series overview

Episodes

Series 1 (1995)
The first series did not broadcast in the intended order it was scheduled, therefore leading to several continuity errors when the episodes aired out of order. The episodes are listed in order of broadcast date.

Series 2 (1996)

Series 3 (1998)

Notes

References

BBC-related lists
Lists of British sitcom episodes